The Panjkora River is a river in the Khyber Pakhtunkhwa province in north-west Pakistan. The river runs through the mountainous northern part of the province, and forms the Kumrat Valley. It passes from Dir, Timergara, and joins with Swat River at Chakdara. It is generally characterized by having steep slopes on either side of the riverbank covered in thick forests. The river has a large catchment area, making the river susceptible to significant  flooding – most notably during the 2010 floods that occurred throughout much of Pakistan.

Geography 
The Panjkora river is the main river in the Panjkora River Basin which is a part of the larger Swat River Basin located in the Khyber Pakhtunkhwa province in the northwest of Pakistan. Main tributaries of the Panjkora river are Rivers Dir, Barawal, Kohistan, and Usherai. The flow of water occurs year-round, during the monsoon season (June-September) the water levels drastically rise. Large amounts of water can be found during this time in the Panjkora river with greater amounts at the mouths of the tributaries. This water flow is very powerful causing floods throughout the region.

The Panjkora river is located at coordinates (Latitude: 34.6667 Longitude: 71.7667). The river is characterised by steep mountain slopes at the beginning, these act as a funnel trapping the water. Towards the end the river starts to widen, and the flood plain begins to sprawl. The lower flood plains are the main agricultural land used by farmers due to the increased nutrient content in the soil.

Pollution and environmental concerns 
Bioaccumulation is the major environmental concern currently occurring in the river Panjkora. Bioaccumulation occurs when a species absorbs substances faster than it expels them. This often has increased effects on predators higher up the food chain which can affect humans who digest these organisms. Panjkora river faces increases in toxic metal accumulation in fish species. Metal content found in fish increases the closer you move to the mouth of the river Panjkora. The metal content occurs because of agricultural practices and sewage dumping in the river.

Agriculture, while being the major industry supporting people living on the river, does come with its downsides. During large rainfall events, huge amounts of runoff occurs, dragging with it the soil, animal droppings and fertilisers. This floods the river with large amounts of lead (Pb) and nickel (Ni). Ni very consistently increased the closer towards the mouth of the river. It is thought that the marble industry effluents were another major source of increase in Ni. The contamination of heavy metals has not yet become a serious health issue for the people who survive off the river. Scientists, however, predict that if not carefully monitored bioaccumulation continues to manifest and accumulate, potentially causing significant health risks to the environment and human health.

Natural disasters 

The Panjkora basin is a temperamental region that is very dependent on the season. The climate in this region of Pakistan is characterised by large downpours during the monsoon season (June- September) and relatively dry winters. The monsoon seasons have caused many significant and devastating floods in the region. Most notably a flood in 2010 swept through the river resulting in loss of life and large amounts of destruction to ecosystems and infrastructure. These high levels of seasonal rainfall are magnified by the topography of the land surrounding the river. Steep slopes on either side of the river allow for water to runoff into the river quickly and in large volumes. While rainfall in these higher altitudes is generally less, the combination of the huge basins tributaries makes for large volumes of water towards the mouth of the river Panjkora. With river systems floods are generally much more likely to occur in the low-lying areas towards the base of the mountains. Panjkora basin has 15% of its area classified as highly prone to flooding. These areas that are flood prone are also inhabited making for a deadly mix of people gambling their lives for the rich alluvial farmland. This then continues to run down the river destroying agricultural land, taking lives and causing infrastructure damage.

Socio-economic impact 
Farmers along the river rely heavily on the rich alluvial soil the flood plains offer. Poor education and management practices mean that the soil often remains fallow for parts of the year.

Course
The river's headwaters are high in the glaciers of Hindu Kush Mountains. It flows south through the Upper Dir District and the Lower Dir District.

Its confluence with the Swat River is in the Malakand District near Totakan. The Swat River is a tributary of the Kabul River, part of the Indus River basin.

Fishing
The Panjkora River is the natural habitat of trout and other freshwater fish sought by anglers. the most common species are cyprinids. snowtrout (Schizothorax plagiostomus) is most common game fish in the upper part of River Panjkora at Kumrat Valley. Brown trout and rainbow trout are exotic species, they were introduced by the British in 1928, while snow trout and other cyprinids are native species of River Panjkora.

See also

References

External links

Map of Gandhara archeological sites, Huntington Collection, Ohio State University

Rivers of Khyber Pakhtunkhwa
Kabul River
Lower Dir District
Malakand District
Upper Dir District
Rivers of Pakistan